Kozjak is a mountain situated on the border between North Macedonia and Serbia. It is situated north-east from Kumanovo. The tallest peak of Kozjak is Virovi at 1284 meters. The river Pčinja flows along the western edge of the mountain.

During the struggle for Macedonia, the Balkan Wars and World War I, Serbian volunteer detachments fought to liberate the region from Turkish, Albanian and Bulgarian tyranny. In World War II Kozjak was occupied by Draža Mihajlović's Chetniks and was a ground of severe battles between them and the Macedonian National Liberation Army at the time supported by the Nazi Germany and its Axis collaborators, Bulgaria and the Independent State of Croatia.

Kozjak is famous for the Prohor Pčinjski monastery in which the first session of the ASNOM was held on 2 August 1944.

References

Mountains of North Macedonia
Mountains of Serbia
North Macedonia–Serbia border
International mountains of Europe
Kumanovo Municipality
Rhodope mountain range